Zinaida Vissarionovna Yermolyeva ( – December 2, 1974) was a Soviet microbiologist of Don Cossack origin most notable for producing penicillin for the Soviet military during World War II. She was a member of the USSR Academy of Medical Sciences at the time of her death.

Career 
In 1921, Yermolyeva graduated from the medical faculty of Donskoy University. From 1925 on, she acted as the head of several microbiology and epidemiology institutes in Moscow.

In 1925, Yermolyeva was appointed head of the Department of Microbial Biochemistry at the USSR Academy of Sciences. There, she began her research on bacteriophages and naturally-occurring antimicrobial agents—lysozyme in particular. During the Second World War, she and Tamara Balezina isolated a penicillin-producing strain of Penicillium crustosum. It was first used in Soviet hospitals in 1943.

In 1942, she published the results of an experiment performed on herself, where she infected herself by drinking a solution of Vibrio cholerae and recovered after treatment. The results of her research were seen as essential in preventative measures against cholera in Russia's war efforts in the Eastern Front of World War II.

In 1947, Yermolyeva became the director of the newly formed Institute of Antibiotics of the USSR Ministry of Public Health. From 1952 until her death, she headed the Department of Microbiology of the Central Post-Graduate Medical Institute in Moscow (now the Russian Medical Academy of Postgraduate Education).

Yermolyeva was married to the microbiologist Lev Zilber, whose brother, the novelist Veniamin Kaverin used the career of Yermolyeva and her husband as a basis for a fictionalized account in his trilogy Open Book (1949–56). The "lively and realistic" depiction of Tatiana, the character based on Yermolyeva, popularized microbiology as a possible career among girls in the Soviet Union.

Awards and recognition 

 Stalin Prize (1943)
 Two Orders of Lenin
 Order of the Red Banner of Labour

Scientific interests 
 Antibiotics
 Bacterial polysaccharides
 Biologically active substances from animal tissues
 Interferon
 Chemotherapy of infection

Scientific writing 
Ermolieva was the author of more than 500 papers, several books, such as "Penicillin", "Antibiotics, Bacterial Polysaccharides, Interferon" and others. She was the founder and chief editor of the Soviet journal "Antibiotiki" ("Antibiotics").

Tribute
On October 24, 2018, Yermolyeva was celebrated with a Google Doodle for her achievements.

References

1898 births
1974 deaths
People from Don Host Oblast
Academicians of the USSR Academy of Medical Sciences
Employees of the Gamaleya Research Institute of Epidemiology and Microbiology
Southern Federal University alumni
Stalin Prize winners
Recipients of the Order of Lenin
Recipients of the Order of the Red Banner of Labour
Russian biologists
Russian microbiologists
Russian women scientists
Soviet microbiologists
Soviet virologists
Soviet women biologists
Soviet women physicians
Soviet women scientists
Women microbiologists